Good Money is a digital online banking platform, often called a neobank, founded by Gunnar Lovelace. Good Money directs 50% of its profits toward environmental and social justice initiatives through impact investments and charitable donations. As a digital platform, Good Money takes no ATM or overdraft fees. The platform's customers vote on where Good Money will invest profits, but their options only include sustainable investments. It is based in San Francisco.

History
Good Money was founded in 2018. Gunnar Lovelace was founder of organic e-commerce company Thrive Market, a direct-to-consumer online grocery store. In December 2018, Good Money announced that it had raised $30 million with a group of investors including Galaxy Digital, Breyer Capital, Mitch Kapor, and Ken Howery.

In January 2019, customers started joining a waitlist to start their accounts. Every customer will potentially get equity in the company when opening an account and can build up that equity by using the service.

Products

The company offers FDIC-insured checking and high-yield savings accounts. When account holders sign up, they are offered a stake in the bank, making it the first digital banking platform that will be owned by its customers. Customers can receive additional equity by installing the Good Money app, setting up a direct deposit, or referring friends.

External links 

 Official website
Good Money in LinkedIn

References

Neobanks
Online banks